Maroantsetra is a district of Analanjirofo in Madagascar. It hosts part of Masoala National Park and part of Makira Natural Park.

Communes
The district is further divided into 20 communes:

 Ambanizana
 Ambinanitelo
 Ambodimanga Rantabe
 Anandrivola
 Andranofotsy
 Androndrono
 Anjanazana
 Ankofa
 Ankofabe
 Antakotako
 Antsahana
 Antsirabe Sahatany
 Mahavelona
 Manambolo
 Mariharano
 Maroantsetra
 Morafeno
 Rantabe
 Sahasindro
 Voloina

Rivers
This district is crossed by the Rantabe river, Voloina, Antainambalana River, Manambolo (Est), Amaranofotsy, Mahalevona River and the Ambanizana.

References 

Districts of Analanjirofo